Vivendi SE is a French mass media holding company headquartered in Paris. Widely known as the owner of Gameloft, Groupe Canal+, Havas, Editis, Prisma Media, Vivendi Village and Dailymotion, the company has activities in television, film, video game, book publishing, print press, communication, tickets and video hosting services.

Bolloré is the largest shareholder at approximately 30% of the company. Vivendi's chairman Yannick Bolloré is also CEO of Havas, which was spun-off from Vivendi in 2000 but has since become a subsidiary. The company is known for its stake in Universal Music Group, which it partially spun-off in 2021.

History

Origins 

On 14 December 1853, a water company named Compagnie générale des eaux (CGE) was created by an imperial decree of Napoleon III. In 1854, CGE obtained a concession in order to supply water to the public in Lyon, serving in that capacity for over a hundred years. In 1861, it obtained a 50-year concession with the City of Paris. CGE also supplied water to Nantes, Venice (from 1880), Constantinople (from 1882) and Porto (from 1883). For more than a century, Compagnie générale des eaux remained largely focused on the water sector.

Following the appointment of Guy Dejouany as CEO in 1976, CGE extended its activities into other sectors with a series of takeovers. Beginning in 1980, CGE began diversifying its operations from water into waste management, energy, transport services, and construction and property. It acquired the Compagnie générale d'entreprises automobiles (CGEA), specialized in industrial vehicles, which was later divided into two branches: Connex (later Veolia Transport) in 1999 and Onyx Environnement (later Veolia Environmental Services) in 1989. CGE then acquired the Compagnie générale de chauffe, and later the Montenay group, with these companies later becoming the Energy Services division of CGE, and later renamed "Dalkia" in 1998.

In 1983, CGE helped to found Canal+, the first pay-TV channel in France, and in the 1990s, they began expanding into telecommunications and mass media, especially after Jean-Marie Messier succeeded Guy Dejouany on 27 June 1996, acquiring companies such as the Babelsberg Studio. In 1996, CGE created Neuf Cegetel to take advantage of the 1998 deregulation of the French telecommunications market, accelerating the move into the media sector which would culminate in the 2000 demerger into Vivendi Universal and Vivendi Environnement (Veolia).

Creation of "Vivendi" 

In 1997, Compagnie Générale des Eaux changed its name to Vivendi, and sold off its property and construction divisions the following year to what would become Vinci SA. Vivendi went on to acquire stakes in or merge with Maroc Telecom, Havas, Cendant Software, Grupo Anaya, and NetHold, a large Continental European pay-TV operator. Beginning in 1998, Vivendi launched digital channels in Italy, Spain, Poland, Scandinavia, Belgium, and the Netherlands.

In June 1999, Vivendi merged with Pathé, the exchange ratio for the merger fixed at three Vivendi shares for every two Pathé shares. The Wall Street Journal estimated the value of the deal at US$2.59 billion. Following the completion of the merger, Vivendi retained Pathé's interests in British Sky Broadcasting Group PLC and CanalSatellite, a French broadcasting corporation, then sold all remaining assets to Jérôme Seydoux's family-owned holding company, Fornier SA, who changed its name to Pathé.

Vivendi Universal SA was created on 8 January 2001 with the merger of the Vivendi media empire with Canal+ television networks and the acquisition of media assets of Canadian company Seagram Company Ltd, owner of Universal Studios.

Vivendi Universal acquired MP3.com and the leading American publisher Houghton Mifflin in year 2001. To raise the funds, Vivendi Universal sold its trade and medical publishing businesses to a group led by Cinven.

Vivendi Environnement

Vivendi Environnement was formed in 1999 by Vivendi to consolidate its environmental divisions, which were CGEA Transport, Onyx Environnement (now Veolia Environmental Services), Dalkia and CGE water division. As a result, CGEA Transport was renamed Connex (later Veolia Transport), and CGE's water division was renamed Vivendi Water (now Veolia Water). In July 2000, Vivendi Environnement was divested through IPOs in Paris and later New York in October 2001. Initially, Vivendi Universal retained a 70% stake in Vivendi Environnement in 2000, but by December 2002, it was reduced to 20.4%. In 2003, Vivendi Environnement was renamed to Veolia Environnement.

Corporate loss 

Vivendi Universal disclosed a corporate loss of €23.3 billion in its 2002 annual report. It responded with financial reshuffling, trying to shore up media holdings while selling off shares in its spin-off companies. Amid intense media scrutiny, its chairman and CEO, Jean-Marie Messier (who had overseen the most dramatic phase of the company's diversification), was subsequently replaced by Jean-René Fourtou. Messier was found guilty of embezzlement in 2011, but not before he was paid over US$20 million as part of his severance package. The company reduced its stake in Vivendi Environnement to 40% and sold its stake in Vinci SA. The company then began reorganizing to stave off bankruptcy, announcing a strategy to sell non-strategic assets. Its largest single shareholder was the family of Edgar Bronfman Jr., who was head of Seagram at the time of the merger. Vivendi sold its stake in Vizzavi to Vodafone, with the exception of Vizzavi France. It also sold 20.4% of Vivendi Environnement's capital to a group of investors, and its stake in North American satellite operator EchoStar Communications Corporation. It also sold its European book publishing to Lagardère. It also sold Houghton Mifflin to Thomas H Lee, Blackstone and Bain consortium for US$1.66 billion. Also, in 2002, Vivendi Universal sold the Belgian and Dutch activities of its subsidiary Scoot Europe to Kapitol, the parent company of online directory Infobel.

In 2003, Vivendi Universal sold Canal+ Technologies to Thomson SA; Tele+ to News Corporation and Telecom Italia. It also sold its 26.3% interest in Xfera. Also in 2003, it sold its consumer magazines to Socpresse and its free newspapers to France Antilles. On 1 December, Vivendi Universal closed a deal to sell MP3.com to CNET. Despite predictions that it would be unable to raise the cash needed, Vivendi Universal bought out one of the two minority shareholders in Cegetel, taking its holding to 60 percent, with Vodafone holding the remaining 40 percent. Management viewed the mobile communications firm as a core asset once the bulk of media assets had been sold off.

Further acquisitions, mergers and divestments 
In 2004, 80% of the Vivendi Universal subsidiary was sold to GE, to form NBC Universal, with Vivendi retaining a 20 percent stake. At the same time, it sold a 50% stake in Canal+ and StudioCanal to the new company. Vivendi also sold its interests in Kencell (re-branded Celtel, Kenya), Monaco Telecom and Sportfive (which it held through Canal+ Group), and sold Newsworld International to the business partnership of Joel Hyatt and former Vice-President of the United States Al Gore. Vivendi also sold Babelsberg Studio.

On 16 December 2005, it was announced that Canal Plus would merge with TPS, France's second largest Pay-TV provider. Vivendi owned 85% of the combined entity.

On 17 January 2006, Vivendi Universal announced it would end its American Depositary Receipt program and its listing on the New York Stock Exchange by the end of the second quarter of 2006, due to lowered trading volume on its shares and high costs.

On 20 April 2006, Vivendi in its current form came into existence, following the sale of an 80% stake in the Vivendi Universal unit to General Electric to form NBC Universal (merging GE's NBC unit and Vivendi's Vivendi Universal unit) and the gradual recovery of the company from its disastrous over-expansion in the late 1990s and the early 2000s. The company announced that shareholders had approved the name change to "Vivendi".

In August 2006, Vivendi signed a deal with Spiralfrog to distribute Vivendi's songs online in the United States and Canada.

On 2 December 2007, Vivendi announced that it would be merging its game publishing unit with Activision in a $18.8 billion deal. This will allow the merged company, Activision Blizzard, to rival Electronic Arts, the world's biggest video games publisher. The merger closed on 9 July 2008, for $9.8 billion. Vivendi held a 52% majority stake in the new business.

On 8 September 2009, Vivendi announced negotiations to buy the Brazilian phone operator Global Village Telecom (GVT). Vivendi took control of GVT at a cost of 56 reais per share, on 13 November, trumping Telefónica's bid. Geneva-based Crédit des Alpes was the investment bank to the transaction, originating the acquisition proposal and advising GVT's majority shareholders.

On 3 December 2009, GE announced it would purchase Vivendi's stake in NBC Universal, which would become a joint venture between GE and Comcast. Vivendi sold its stake in NBC Universal on 25 January 2011.

On 4 April 2011, Vodafone sold its 44% stake in French mobile service provider SFR to Vivendi for about $11 billion and giving Vivendi full control of its largest unit.

In 2012, Vivendi announced having entered a strategic review of its assets and decided to refocus its activities on media and content activities while maximizing its telecoms assets.

On 25 July 2013, Activision Blizzard announced the buyout of 429 million shares from Vivendi for $5.83 billion, dropping the shareholder from a 63% stake to 11.8% by the end of the deal in September, ending Vivendi's majority ownership of Activision Blizzard.

In November 2013, Vivendi also sold its 53% stake in Maroc Telecom to Dubai-based Etisalat for around $4.2 billion.

Vivendi also confirmed in November 2013 its intention to launch a demerger plan which would result in Vivendi becoming an international media group consisting primarily of Canal+, Universal Music Group and GVT, while SFR would be listed separately on the stock market. As a result of the foregoing, Vivendi group results for the first semester 2014 are in a strong growth, witnessing the success of its repositioning strategy. Net income was up 84,8% to €1.9 billion. In August 2014 Vivendi sells GVT to Telefônica Vivo, a subsidiary of Telefónica in Brazil.

The moves have allowed Vivendi to rapidly pay down debt and increase cash returns to shareholders while leaving it with ammunition to do acquisitions of its own. Indeed, once the SFR deal closes, Vivendi will have a cash pile of around €5 billion, leaving it with some room to maneuver even after it pays down debt and returns nearly €5 billion in dividends and share buybacks to shareholders.

Vivendi's priority is now content. The French group is expected to expand its assets in the content industries in the coming year.

In 2014, Vivendi decided to sell mobile companies SFR (France) to Patrick Drahi's company, Altice, and GVT (Brazil) to the Brazilian company Telefônica Vivo.

On 28 May 2014, Vivendi sold half of its remaining shares (nearly 41.5 million shares) in Activision Blizzard for $850 million, reducing its stake to 6%.

In April 2015, it was announced that a shareholder in the company Bolloré raised its stake from 10.2 percent to 12.01 percent for a total fee of €568 million.

In 2015, Vivendi bought 80% share in Dailymotion. According to the Wall Street Journal, the "French media group offered around $273 million for streaming service". Vivendi was in talks with Orange, to Buy 80% stake in Dailymotion. Also, Vivendi announced extra payouts in compromise with P. Schoenfeld Asset Management shareholder.

It was revealed in October 2015 that Vivendi would increase its stake in Telecom Italia to around 19% of the ordinary share capital as part of its aims to increase its influence in the group. As of May 2017, Vivendi owns 24.6% of the company with Vivendi's CEO Arnaud de Puyfontaine becoming Executive Chairman of Telecom Italia.

In October 2015, Vivendi bought minority stakes in the French video game studios Gameloft and Ubisoft. On 17 December 2015, Vivendi acquired a 64.4% majority stake in Belgian online radio aggregator Radionomy (including its media player platform Winamp and internet radio streaming software Shoutcast). Its shareholders, including its employees and U.S.-based investment firm Union Square Ventures, however, retained their stakes in the company.

In June 2016, after having triggered a mandatory tender offer in February 2016 by reaching 30% ownership, and then becoming its largest shareholder, Vivendi completed a hostile takeover of Gameloft with the acquisition of its founders' stake. At the same time, Vivendi also further increased its stake in Ubisoft, which had led to concern from the company's management that Vivendi was also planning a hostile takeover of Ubisoft, however as of 2018 Vivendi is no longer in the position to do so.

Vivendi (once the owner of Blizzard, later Activision Blizzard), searching for a new games publisher property has started investing in both Ubisoft and Gameloft. The brothers in charge of Ubisoft and Gameloft, Yves Guillemot and Michel Guillemot respectively, view the investments as a hostile takeover attempt, and are raising capital from within the family and from Canadian investors to maintain control of the companies. As of 8 June 2016, Vivendi has acquired a controlling stake in Gameloft. In news from 11 September 2016 Yves Guillemot is set to buy an additional 3.5% of Ubisoft shares to raise his stake to 12.5% to attempt to block a takeover from Vivendi. Yves has been attempting to lobby other shareholders to prevent them selling their shares to Vivendi. As of 20 March 2018, Vivendi has sold all its shares in Ubisoft and Tencent has bought in in their place.

In an auction on 6 June, Vivendi won a bid to acquire Flavorus from SFX Entertainment for $4 million. Also that month, it acquired Paddington and Company Limited-owner of Paddington Bear and other properties, and The Copyrights Group.

Vivendi declared that it owned 12.3% of Mediaset in December 2016. In September 2020, Vivendi owns 28.8% of Mediaset. In January 2019, Vivendi completed its €900 million acquisition of Editis, one of France's major book publishers.

In 2019, Vivendi acquired Nigeria's film studio ROK Studios which included it's linear channels and VOD service, IROKO+.

At the end of the first quarter of 2020, Vivendi completed a partial sale of Universal Music Group (UMG) to a consortium led by Tencent, a Chinese media conglomerate. The amount of stake of the world's largest record label group that has been sold to the consortium is 10% and the valuation of which was $3.3 billion. The Tencent-led consortium retained an option to purchase another 10% at the same valuation until January 2021, which they opted to exercise in December 2020. Pershing Square Holdings later acquired 10% of UMG prior to its IPO on the Euronext Amsterdam stock exchange. The company went public on September 21, 2021, at a valuation of €46 billion.

In April 2020, Vivendi bought a 10.6% stake in Lagardère Group, another French media group. The investment was made at the time when Lagardère, the assets of which include the world's third-largest book publisher Hachette, is faced with attacks from a group of fierce and well-funded activist investors, and a year after Vivendi completed its takeover of Editis, the smaller domestic book publisher. By August, Vivendi has doubled its stake in Lagardère to 23.5%, becoming the largest shareholder of the rival group.

In October 2020, Vivendi acquired a 12% stake in South Africa's media company, MultiChoice.

In December 2020, Vivendi announced a deal to buy the French media conglomerate Prisma Media from Bertelsmann. In January 2021, Vivendi bought a 9,9% stake in the Spanish media conglomerate Prisa.

In September 2021, Vivendi distributed 60% of its UMG shares to shareholders and retaining 10% shares in an IPO at Euronext Amsterdam.

In September 2021, Amber Capital has informed Vivendi of its intention to sell all its shares in Lagardère (17.93 of the share capital) and has invited Vivendi to make an acquisition offer. Vivendi has acquired Amber Capital's shares for 24.1 euros per share. The transaction will be completed by December 15, 2022, after gaining the approvals required by the current regulations in light of the takeover that could result from the mandatory public offer following this acquisition. In December 2021, Vivendi announced its plan to accelerate the purchase of Amber's stake in Lagardere. , Vivendi owns 57.3% of Lagardère following the latter's IPO. Vivendi has offered to divest the book publisher Editis, as Lagardère already owns Hachette.

In July 2022, Vivendi announced its plan to spin off Editis, anticipating the European competition regulators not to allow Editis and Lagardere Publishing to merge.

Corporate governance 
As of 31 December 2019, Vivendi ownership is as follows:
 Bolloré (27.06%)
 Société Générale (5.29%)
 Caisse des dépôts et consignations (3.23%)
 Vivendi Employees (2.95%)
 DNCA Finance (0,31%)
 Self Control (1,18%)
 Other Shareholders (59.99%)

Supervisory board
As of 16 May 2020, the board is comprised as follows:
 Yannick Bolloré (chairman), CEO of Havas
 Philippe Bénacin, chairman and CEO of Interparfums
 Cyrille Bolloré, former chairman and CEO of Bolloré
 Paulo Cardoso, treasurer of Canal+
 Laurent Dassault, co-managing director of Dassault Group
 Dominique Delport, former executive at M6, Canal+, and Havas
 Véronique Driot-Argentin, Vivendi HR executive
 Aliza Jabès, chairwoman of NUXE
 Cathia Lawson-Hall, executive at Société Générale
 Sandrine Le Bihan, Vivendi legal executive
 Michèle Reiser, filmmaker and culture commissioner
 Katie Stanton, general partner of Moxxie Ventures
 Athina Vasilogiannaki, legal and business affairs director of Minos EMI

Business units 

Vivendi is a company primarily focused on digital entertainment. It owns the French TV channel and movie producer Canal+ Group, book publisher Editis, communication company Havas Group, video games company Gameloft, and video hosting service Dailymotion.

Vivendi's president Vincent Bolloré, appointed in June 2014, aims at developing synergies between the company's subsidiaries now refocused on media: Canal+ Group, Vivendi Village, Dailymotion and Gameloft.

Groupe Canal+ 
Groupe Canal+ is the leading pay television group in France. It is also an international movie and television series producer and distributor with StudioCanal. In November 2013, Vivendi became the exclusive owner of France's biggest pay-TV company.

Havas Group 
Havas Group is one of the largest global advertising and communications groups in the world. Since October 2017, Vivendi owns 94.75% of Havas's Share Capital.

Gameloft 
In July 2016, Vivendi completed its takeover of Gameloft, the world's largest mobile-games publisher in terms of downloads. Gameloft reported that their games had amassed over 1 billion downloads in 2016.

Editis 
Vivendi owns the French publisher Editis, which it acquired in January 2019 for €900 million. Editis is one of France's largest publishers.

Vivendi Village 
Vivendi Village comprises a group of small companies active in digital and in live entertainment.

Vivendi Ticketing comprises the ticketing businesses See Tickets in the UK, the US, and in France. Both businesses specialize in the retail and distribution of tickets for live entertainment, sport and cultural events, in addition to providing operating platforms for venues to run their own ticketing services. Vivendi Ticketing processes annually over 40 million tickets. The business also operates as an internal service provider to other Vivendi businesses.

MyBestPro provides experts counseling in different fields (Wengo, RDVmedicaux, Juritravail, Bordas, Devispresto).

Vivendi Village also owns the Paris-based concert venue L'Olympia and the Théâtre de l'Oeuvre.

In 2015, Vivendi announced that it will open venues in central and west Africa. These venues will be named CanalOlympia, they will serve as concert halls, theaters and screening rooms.

Prisma Media 
In 2021, Vivendi purchased Prisma Media from Gruner + Jahr for an estimated 100 to 150 million euros.

Prisma Media is number one magazine publishing group in France.

Dailymotion 
In 2015, Vivendi purchased an 80% stake in Dailymotion from its previous owner, Orange S.A.

Vivendi announced that it increased this stake to 90% in September 2015.

Equity investments

See also 

 List of French companies

References

External links 

 

 
CAC 40
Companies based in Paris
Companies formerly listed on the New York Stock Exchange
Companies listed on Euronext Paris
Conglomerate companies of France
French brands
French companies established in 1853
French companies established in 1998
Holding companies established in 1853
Holding companies established in 1998
Holding companies of France
Mass media companies of France
Mass media companies established in 1853
Mass media companies established in 1998
Mass media in Paris
Multinational companies headquartered in France
Bolloré